Kay Sloth Friis Jørgensen (born February 18, 1946) is a former Danish handball player who competed in the 1972 Summer Olympics and in the 1976 Summer Olympics.

He played his club handball with IF Stjernen. In 1972 he was part of the Denmark men's national handball team which finished thirteenth in the Olympic tournament. He played three matches as goalkeeper. Four years later he finished eighth with the Danish team in the 1976 Olympic tournament. He played all six matches as goalkeeper.

References

1946 births
Living people
Danish male handball players
Olympic handball players of Denmark
Handball players at the 1972 Summer Olympics
Handball players at the 1976 Summer Olympics